is a district of Itabashi, Tokyo, Japan. As of February 1, 2016, the population in the district is 1,139. The postal code is 175-0085.

Facilities 
 Akatsuka Park

References

Districts of Itabashi